Simeon Thoresen (born March 14, 1984) is a Norwegian mixed martial artist currently competing in the Welterweight division of Cage Warriors. A professional competitor since 2006, he formerly competed for the UFC, DEEP, and BAMMA.

Mixed martial arts career

Background
He started training karate at an early age, but choose to devote himself to gymnastics instead at the age of 8.

Thoresen started training BJJ and Thai Boxing in 2003 with Jan T. Stange. With no experience in grappling he was dominated and humiliated by a grappler during a training session. This experience led Thoresen to start training extensively on his ground game. He trained with Team Valhall and Team Pammachon in Sandefjord for a while and won his first and only amateur MMA match in 2005.

After that he moved on to Oslo and Hellboy Hansen MMA in order to train full-time. He attributes much of his success to his training under Joachim Hansen. Hansen in turn has describe Thoresen as “a guy with amazing talent, who I truly believe will be a champion in the future.”

Early career
Thoresen made his professional debut in August 2006 with a win over Clifford Hall at Intense Fighting 5: Caged. He still maintains close ties with Team Valhall and is usually cornered during his matches by Valhall Gym's main MMA coach Tommy Rasmussen and Jan T. Stange.

At Adrenaline 2: Rise of the Champions he defeated Brazilian jiu-jitsu purple belt André Mineus and amateur Shooto champion Cole Lauritsen to win the Adrenaline Sports welterweight title in Denmark. He never defended his title and on December 7, 2008 Adrenaline announced that Thoresen "has forfeit his championship belt, since he has signed a contract with a very big promotion in Japan."

Thoresen debuted for the DEEP in October 2008, losing to Eiji Ishikawa by majority decision. Following the loss, Thoresen competed primarily in England for promotions such as Cage Wars and BAMMA. He amassed an impressive streak (7 wins, 1 loss and 1 draw) over the next two and half years.

Ultimate Fighting Championship
Thoresen confirmed that he had signed a multi-fight contract with the UFC on December 29, 2011.

In his debut, Thoresen faced fellow newcomer Besam Yousef on April 14, 2012 at UFC on Fuel TV: Gustafsson vs. Silva. He won the fight via submission in the second round.

Thoresen next fought Seth Baczynski on September 22, 2012 at UFC 152. Thoresen used his reach to keep Baczynski at bay and landed several big punches that caused a gash on the nose of Baczynski, Thoresen was then knocked out by a punch from Baczynski late in the first round.

Thoresen faced David Mitchell on January 26, 2013 at UFC on Fox 6. Thoresen lost the fight via unanimous decision and was subsequently released from the promotion.

Post-UFC career
Thoresen was expected to face Peter Sobotta at MMA Attack 4 on October 26, 2013, however the event was cancelled.

Due to his previous fight being cancelled, Thoresen was then scheduled for a fight against Domingos Mestre at Superior Challenge 9 on November 13, 2013. However, Thoresen was forced from the bout due to injury.

In February, 2014, one year post his UFC career, Thoresen signed a five-fight deal with Cage Warriors. His first fight was on June 7, 2014 against Jake Bostwick at Cage Warriors Fighting Championship 69.  He lost the fight via majority decision.

March 28, 2015, Thoresen fought Jack Mason at British Challenge MMA 10 in Colchester, Essex, England. He lost the fight via unanimous decision.

Championships and accomplishments

Mixed martial arts
Ultimate Warrior Challenge
UWC Welterweight Championship (One time)

Mixed martial arts record

|-
| Loss
| align=center| 17–6–1
| Jack Mason
| Decision (unanimous)
| British Challenge MMA 10
| 
| align=center| 3
| align=center| 5:00
| Colchester, England
| 
|-
| Loss
| align=center| 17–5–1
| Jake Bostwick
| Decision (majority)
| Cage Warriors FC 69
| 
| align=center| 3
| align=center| 5:00
| London, England
| 
|-
| Loss
| align=center| 17–4–1
| David Mitchell
| Decision (unanimous)
| UFC on Fox: Johnson vs. Dodson
| 
| align=center| 3
| align=center| 5:00
| Chicago, Illinois, United States
| 
|-
| Loss
| align=center| 17–3–1
| Seth Baczynski
| KO (punch)
| UFC 152
| 
| align=center| 1
| align=center| 4:10
| Toronto, Ontario, Canada
| 
|-
| Win
| align=center| 17–2–1
| Besam Yousef
| Submission (rear-naked choke)
| UFC on Fuel TV: Gustafsson vs. Silva
| 
| align=center| 2
| align=center| 2:36
| Stockholm, Sweden
| 
|-
| Win
| align=center| 16–2–1
| Manuel Garcia
| Submission (rear-naked choke)
| Ultimate Warrior Challenge 17
| 
| align=center| 1
| align=center| 0:34
| Southend-on-Sea, England
| 
|-
| Win
| align=center| 15–2–1
| Fabricio Nascimento
| Submission (rear-naked choke)
| Ultimate Warrior Challenge 16
| 
| align=center| 1
| align=center| 2:35
| Essex, England
| 
|-
| Loss
| align=center| 14–2–1
| Seydina Seck
| TKO (punches & knees to the body)
| ADFC: Round 3
| 
| align=center| 1
| align=center| 2:02
| Abu Dhabi, United Arab Emirates
| 
|-
| Win
| align=center| 14–1–1
| Vaidas Valancius
| Submission (rear naked choke) 
| Cage Wars
| 
| align=center| 1
| align=center| 4:44
| Belfast, Northern Ireland
| 
|-
| Win
| align=center| 13–1–1
| Marco Santi
| Submission (rear naked choke) 
| BAMMA 4
| 
| align=center| 1
| align=center| 3:59
| Birmingham, England
| 
|-
| Win
| align=center| 12–1–1
| John Maguire
| Decision (unanimous)
| BAMMA 3
| 
| align=center| 3
| align=center| 5:00
| Birmingham, England
| 
|-
| Draw
| align=center| 11–1–1
| Michael Costa
| Draw
| Art of War 14
| 
| align=center| 2
| align=center| 5:00
| Cotai, Macau
| 
|-
| Win
| align=center| 11–1
| Sam Rocha
| Submission (rear-naked choke)
| Pain and Glory: Underground
| 
| align=center| 1
| align=center| 0:44
| London, England
| 
|-
| Win
| align=center| 10–1
| Aurelijus Kerpe
| Submission (arm-triangle choke)
| Pain and Glory: Underground
| 
| align=center| 2
| align=center| N/A
| London, England
| 
|-
| Loss
| align=center| 9–1
| Eiji Ishikawa
| Decision (majority)
| DEEP: 38 Impact
| 
| align=center| 2
| align=center| 5:00
| Tokyo, Japan
| 
|-
| Win
| align=center| 9–0
| Matt Thorpe
| Submission (kimura)
| Cage Warriors: Enter the Rough House 7
| 
| align=center| 1
| align=center| 0:51
| Nottingham, England
| 
|-
| Win
| align=center| 8–0
| Cole Lauritsen
| Submission (armbar)
| Adrenaline 2: Rise of the Champions
| 
| align=center| 1
| align=center| 4:03
| Denmark
| 
|-
| Win
| align=center| 7–0
| Andre Mineus
| Submission (armbar)
| Adrenaline 2: Rise of the Champions
| 
| align=center| 2
| align=center| 1:30
| Denmark
| 
|-
| Win
| align=center| 6–0
| Paul Jenkins
| Submission (armbar)
| Ultimate Warrior Challenge 6
| 
| align=center| 1
| align=center| 1:06
| Essex, England
| 
|-
| Win
| align=center| 5–0
| Chas Jacquier
| TKO (strikes)
| Ultimate Warrior Challenge 5
| 
| align=center| 1
| align=center| 3:04
| England
| 
|-
| Win
| align=center| 4–0
| Soli Clichko
| Submission (armbar)
| Ultimate Warrior Challenge 4
| 
| align=center| 1
| align=center| 1:33
| England
| 
|-
| Win
| align=center| 3–0
| Clifford Hall
| Submission (triangle choke)
| Ultimate Warrior Challenge 3
| 
| align=center| 1
| align=center| 2:16
| England
| 
|-
| Win
| align=center| 2–0
| Lee Dickson
| Submission (triangle choke)
| Ultimate Warrior Challenge 2
| 
| align=center| 2
| align=center| 4:01
| Southend, England
| 
|-
| Win
| align=center| 1–0
| Clifford Hall
| Submission (triangle choke)
| Intense Fighting 5
| 
| align=center| 2
| align=center| 1:12
| England
|

See also
List of male mixed martial artists

References

External links
 

1984 births
Living people
People from Sandefjord
Norwegian male mixed martial artists
Welterweight mixed martial artists
Mixed martial artists utilizing Muay Thai
Mixed martial artists utilizing Brazilian jiu-jitsu
Norwegian Muay Thai practitioners
Norwegian practitioners of Brazilian jiu-jitsu
Ultimate Fighting Championship male fighters
Sportspeople from Vestfold og Telemark